= 1954 Liechtenstein fishing licences referendum =

- 3 October 1954

Results
Choice	Votes	%
Fishing licence initiative	1,382	61.07%
Landtag counter-proposal	212	9.37%
Against both	669	29.56%
Valid votes	2,263	87.71%
Invalid or blank votes	317	12.29%
Total votes	2,580	100.00%
Registered voters/turnout	3,406	75.75%

A referendum on fishing licences was held in Liechtenstein on 3 October 1954. Voters had the choice between the main proposal, a counter-proposal from the Landtag, or against. The main proposal was approved by 61.1% of voters.

== Results ==
Choice	Votes	%
For the fishing licence initiative	1,382	61.1
For the Landtag counter-proposal	212	9.4
Against	669	29.6
Invalid/blank votes	317	–
Total	2,580	100
Registered voters/turnout	3,406	75.7
Source: Nohlen & Stöver
